Mario Miethig (born 7 December 1961) is a former German footballer.

Miethig made seven appearances in the 2. Fußball-Bundesliga for Tennis Borussia Berlin during his playing career.

References

External links 
 

1961 births
Living people
German footballers
Association football midfielders
2. Bundesliga players
Hertha Zehlendorf players
Tennis Borussia Berlin players
Cardiff City F.C. players